Gamamedaliyanage Joseph Lalith Neomal Perera (born May 7, 1965) is a Sri Lankan politician, a member of the Parliament of Sri Lanka and a government minister.

References
 

1965 births
Living people
Sri Lankan Roman Catholics
Members of the 11th Parliament of Sri Lanka
Members of the 12th Parliament of Sri Lanka
Members of the 13th Parliament of Sri Lanka
Members of the 14th Parliament of Sri Lanka
Government ministers of Sri Lanka
United National Party politicians
United People's Freedom Alliance politicians